Nadeem al-Zaro (29 June 1931 – 28 February 2014) was a Jordanian politician. He held several ministerial posts during the 1970s. Zaro was Interior Minister during the fourth term of Prime Minister Bahjat Talhouni in 1970. He was Transport Minister during the term of Prime Minister Ahmad al-Lawzi (1971–1973). He continued in this position during the subsequent government of Zaid al-Rifai.

References

1931 births
2014 deaths
People from Ramallah
Interior ministers of Jordan
Transport ministers of Jordan
Palestinian expatriates in Jordan